Honey Creek, Iowa may refer to the following settlements in Iowa:

 Honey Creek Township, Delaware County, Iowa
 Honey Creek Township, Iowa County, Iowa
 Honey Creek, Pottawattamie County, Iowa